Tracktor Bowling was a Russian nu metal band, formed in Moscow in 1996.

History
The band formed in 1996. In 2000, their demo-track record "Mutatsiya" ("Mutation") gained early success and netted them a budding reputation as leaders of the Moscow alternative rock scene.

Their debut album was released in 2002. The band released five albums, one Live-album, one DVD and some singles. It is a popular modern Russian alternative metal band, alongside ones such as Amatory, Slot, Stigmata and others.

Members
Lou (vocals)
Kondrat (vocals, guitar)
Mult (guitar)
Vit (bass)
Stepan (drums)

Awards and nominations

|-
|2003  || - || Finalist in nomination «Best Russian Act» in Moscow Alternative Music Awards|| 
|-
|2006  || - || Best Act 2005–2006 in Russian Alternative Music Prize || 
|-
|2007  || - || Finalist in nomination «Best Alternative Act» in Moskovskij Komsomolets Newspaper || 
|-
|2008  || Song «Время» || Best Soundtrack (for «Nirvana» Movie) in Moscow Alternative Music Awards || 
|-

Discography

Albums
Напролом (2002)
Черта (2005)
Шаги по стеклу (2006)
Tracktor Bowling (2010)
Бесконечность (2015)

Singles
It’s Time To… (2005)
Время (2008)
Поколение Рок (2008)
Ни шагу назад (2009)

DVDs
Два шага до… и год после (2006)

Demo recordings
Alternative Invasion Vol.1 (1997)
Мутация (1999)
Мутация 2 [000] (2000)

Literature
Interview @ Rovesnik Magazine, 2011, p. 16
Interview @ Dark City, No. 55, 2010, p. 32

See also
Louna
Slot

References

Sources

Page @ myspace
Page @ last.fm (more than 70.000 listeners)

Musical groups from Moscow
Musical groups established in 1996
Russian alternative metal musical groups
Russian nu metal musical groups